Andrew Hardie may refer to:
Andrew Hardie, Baron Hardie (born 1946), Scottish Labour Party politician and Government minister
Andrew Hardie (radical), Scottish radical, executed for his part in Radical War of 1820

See also
Andy Hardy, fictional character